DNA Films is a British film production company founded by Andrew Macdonald and Duncan Kenworthy in 1997. They also have a television division with Walt Disney Television called DNA TV Limited.

Location
DNA Films has been one of the most successful production companies that is located in the United Kingdom. DNA Films is located in London.

Film productions
 Trainspotting (1996)
 Beautiful Creatures (2000)
 Strictly Sinatra (2001)
 The Parole Officer (2001)
 Heartlands (2002)
 The Final Curtain (2002)
 28 Days Later (2002)
 Love Actually (2003)
 Separate Lies (2005)
 Notes on a Scandal (2006)
 The History Boys (2006)
 The Last King of Scotland (2006)
 Sunshine (2007)
 28 Weeks Later (2007)
 Never Let Me Go (2010)
 Dredd (2012) (co-production with IM Global, Lionsgate, Reliance BIG Pictures, IMAX and Entertainment Film Distributors)
 Sunshine on Leith (2013) 
 Ex Machina (2014)
 Far from the Madding Crowd (2015)
 T2 Trainspotting (2017)
 Annihilation (2018)
 Devs (2020) (TV)
 Black Narcissus (2020) (TV)
 Sir Alex Ferguson: Never Give In (2021)
 Men (2022)

References

External links

Film production companies of the United Kingdom
Mass media companies based in London
Mass media companies established in 1997